The following outline is provided as an overview of and topical guide to Tibet:

Tibet is a plateau region in Asia and the home to the indigenous Tibetan people. With an average elevation of 4,900 metres (16,000 ft), it is the highest region on Earth and is commonly referred to as the "Roof of the World."

A unified Tibet first came into being under Songtsen Gampo in the 7th century. From the early 17th century until the 1959 uprising, the Dalai Lamas (Tibetan Buddhist spiritual leaders) were, at least nominally, heads of a centralised Tibetan administration, with political power to administer religious and administrative authority over large parts of Tibet from the traditional capital Lhasa.  They are believed to be the emanations of Avalokiteśvara (or "Chenrezig" [spyan ras gzigs] in Tibetan), the bodhisattva of compassion.

General reference 

 Pronunciation:
 Common English names: Tibet; or Xizang
 Official English names: Xizang Autonomous Region of the People's Republic of China
 Common endonym(s):  
 Official endonym(s):  
 Adjectival(s): Tibetan
 Demonym(s): Tibetans
 Etymology: Name of Tibet
 ISO region code for Xizang: CN-54

Geography of Tibet 

Geography of Tibet
 Location:
 Northern Hemisphere and Eastern Hemisphere
 Eurasia
 Asia
 Central Asia
 South Asia
 East Asia
 Time zone: China Standard Time (UTC+08)
 Extreme points of Tibet
 High: Mount Everest  – highest point on Earth
 Low: Yarlung Tsangpo 
 Demographics of Tibet
 Atlas of Tibet

Environment of Tibet 
 Climate
 Flora (plants of Tibet)
 Lichens
 Grasses
 Ampelocissus xizangensis
 Anisodus tanguticus
 Aralia tibetana
 Borinda
 Buddleja crispa var. tibetica
 Buddleja forrestii
 Cedrus deodara
 Cupressus gigantea
 Cupressus torulosa
 Fagopyrum tibeticum
 Fallopia baldschuanica
 Incarvillea
 Juniperus indica
 Juniperus tibetica
 Luculia gratissima
 Paeonia lactiflora
 Russian sage
 Noble rhubarb
 Salvia castanea
 Salvia wardii
 Spikenard
 Tetrapanax tibetanus
 Tibetan elm
 Siberian elm
 Utricularia salwinensis
 Fauna
 Tibetan wild ass
 Tibetan gazelle
 Snow leopard
 Black-necked crane

Geographic features of Tibet 
 Tibetan Plateau
 Surrounding mountains:
 Himalayas
 Kunlun Mountains
 Altyn-Tagh
 Qilian Mountains
 Hengduan Mountains
 Karakoram
 Lake Region (Changtang):
 Pangong Tso
 Lake Rakshastal
 Lake Manasarovar
 Yamdrok Lake
 Dagze Lake
 Namtso
 Pagsum Lake
 Siling Lake
 Lhamo La-tso
 Lumajangdong Co
 Qinghai Lake
 River region:
 Yellow River
 Yangtze River
 Yalong River
 Salween River (Nu)
 Mekong (Lancang)
 Indus River
 Sutlej
 South Tibet Valley:
 Yarlung Tsangpo Grand Canyon
 Yarlung Tsangpo River (Brahmaputra River)
 Nyang River
 Lake Paiku
 Lake Puma Yumco

Administrative divisions of Tibet 

Administrative divisions of Tibet
 Capital of Tibet: Lhasa

Tibet is divided into 7 prefecture-level divisions, 73 county-level divisions, and 692 township-level divisions. The 7 prefecture-level divisions are:
 Lhasa City
 Nagchu Prefecture
 Chamdo Prefecture
 Nyingtri Prefecture
 Shannan Prefecture
 Shigatse Prefecture
 Ngari Prefecture

There are also three traditional provinces or regions of Tibet:
Ü-Tsang
Amdo
Kham

Government and politics of Tibet 

Politics in Tibet
 Form of government: Autonomous areas of China; Government in exile
 Capital of Tibet: Lhasa

Branches of the government of Tibet

Executive branch of the government of Tibet 
 Chairman of the Tibet Autonomous Region: Padma Choling
 Local Communist Party secretary: Zhang Qingli

Legislative branch of the government of Tibet

Judicial branch of the government of Tibet

Foreign relations of Tibet 

Foreign relations of Tibet

International organization membership 
none

Local government in Tibet

Law and order in Tibet 

Law of Tibet
 Constitution of Tibet
 Human rights in Tibet
 LGBT rights in Tibet
 Freedom of religion in Tibet

Government in exile

Central Tibetan Administration
 Sikyong or Kalon Tripa
 Parliament of the Central Tibetan Administration
 National Democratic Party of Tibet

History of Tibet 

 List of rulers of Tibet
 Neolithic Tibet
 Zhangzhung
 Pre-Imperial Tibet
 Tibetan Empire
 Sino-Tibetan relations during the Tang dynasty
 Era of Fragmentation
 Guge
 Mongol conquest of Tibet
 Tibet under Yuan rule
 Bureau of Buddhist and Tibetan Affairs
 Imperial Preceptor
 Dpon-chen
 Phagmodrupa Dynasty
 Rinpungpa
 Tsangpa
 Sino-Tibetan relations during the Ming dynasty
 Ganden Phodrang
 Tibet under Qing rule
 Chinese expedition to Tibet (1720)
 Lifan Yuan
 Lhasa riot of 1750
 Golden Urn
 Chinese expedition to Tibet (1910)
 Xinhai Lhasa turmoil
 History of European exploration in Tibet
 British expedition to Tibet
 Tibet (1912–51)
 Sino-Tibetan War
 Qinghai–Tibet War
 History of Tibet (1950–present)
 Annexation of Tibet by the People's Republic of China
 Battle of Chamdo
 CIA Tibetan program
 Protests and uprisings in Tibet since 1950
 1959 Tibetan uprising
 1987–89 Tibetan unrest
 2008 Tibetan unrest
 Self-immolation protests by Tibetans in China

Culture of Tibet 

Tibetan Culture
 Tibetan people
 Cuisine of Tibet
 Traditional Tibetan medicine
 Tibetan calendar
 Tibetan Festivals
 Public holidays
 Newspapers in Tibet
 Sport in Tibet

Religion in Tibet 
 Religion in Tibet
 Tibetan Buddhism
 Tibetan Muslims
 Bön

Art in Tibet 
 Tibetan art
 Contemporary Tibetan art
 Architecture of Tibet
 Tibetan Buddhist architecture
 World Heritage Sites in Tibet:
 Potala Palace
 Jokhang
 Norbulingka
 Tibetan-language films
 Tibetan Literature
 Music of Tibet
 Pargo Kaling

National symbols of Tibet 
 Emblem of Tibet
 Flag of Tibet
 Tibetan National Anthem
 Tibetan Uprising Day

Economy and infrastructure of Tibet 

Economy of Tibet
 Currency: Renminbi Yuan (de facto)
 ISO 4217: CNY
 Education in Tibet
 Transport in Tibet
 Airports in Tibet
 Qingzang Railway
 Roads in Tibet

See also 

Tibet
Index of Tibet-related articles
List of international rankings
List of Tibet-related topics
Outline of Asia
Outline of China
Outline of geography

References

External links

 Tibetan Studies Internet Resources

Tibet
Tibet